World Airways, Inc. was a United States airline headquartered in Peachtree City, Georgia in Greater Atlanta. The company operated mostly non-scheduled services but did fly scheduled passenger services as well, notably with McDonnell Douglas DC-10 wide body jetliners. World Airways ceased all operations on March 27, 2014.

History

World Airways was founded on March 29, 1948 by Benjamin Pepper with the introduction of ex-Pan Am Boeing 314 flying boats. Edward Daly, however, is thought of as World's founder. He bought the airline in 1950 for $50,000 and proceeded to acquire DC-4s.

World got its first government contract in 1951 and had a substantial amount of government business throughout the rest of its operational history.

Later, World acquired DC-6s and Lockheed Constellations. World entered the jet era in the late 1960s with Boeing 707s and 727s. In the early 1970s, World acquired Douglas DC-8s.

World became a key military contractor during the Vietnam War, flying troops and equipment between the war zone and World's base at Oakland International Airport. On March 29, 1975, World operated the last airlift flight out of Đà Nẵng, Vietnam. Two 727s were flown to Đà Nẵng, one of which had Ed Daly aboard. Thousands rushed the airplane and it took off on a taxiway under heavy fire. The aircraft with Daly aboard started its takeoff roll with the 727's back airstairs still down with Daly fending off additional people trying to leave due to over capacity (The film of this was later broadcast on the CBS Evening News on March 30, 1975).  When the airplane landed at Saigon, there were 268 people in the cabin and possibly 60 or more in the cargo holds. World did not return to Đà Nẵng until April 17, 2002, then with an MD-11 aircraft to pick up a team of people resolving Missing-In-Action cases from the Vietnam War.

In the early 1970s through the early 1980s, World operated three Boeing 747 aircraft and was the launch customer for the "flip nose" front-loading variant of the 747. Later, World acquired DC-10s that were eventually retired in 2010.

In 1986 slots for lucrative routes on the east coast became available, and with the competitive nature for these routes, they were offered to interested airlines in the form of a lottery, or what was called the “Slottery”. World was awarded three city pairs: Boston, Washington National, and New York LaGuardia. In order to acquire these slots, the routes had to be operated for at least three months. World's intention was to sell the routes for a profit to another airline rather than establishing their own operation on these routes, so the company operated fully crewed Boeing 727s (flight deck and cabin crew) without passengers, flying between the scheduled city pairs with touch and go landings and takeoffs. As planned, the routes were then sold for profit. World experienced heavy losses in the 1980s as a result of operating scheduled passenger services, ending scheduled service September 15, 1986. In 1987, the company moved its headquarters from Oakland to Washington Dulles International Airport, acquired Key Airlines from Bain Capital's Presidential Airways, and established ties to Malaysia Airlines. World was burdened financially as its cash was siphoned off by parent WorldCorp to support a telecommunications venture in which the parent had invested. During the first Persian Gulf War, World did a substantial amount of profitable business for the military, enabling the addition of the MD-11 to the fleet. During the mid-1990s, World operated the military passenger trunk route from Osan Air Base, Korea and Kadena Air Base, Okinawa to Los Angeles, using MD-11 aircraft. World has been headquartered near Atlanta Hartsfield International Airport.

The airline received a substantial amount of its business from the military, especially in its role connecting American bases in the U.S. to the Middle East. It also thrived on passenger and freight contracts with private organizations, such as the Jacksonville Jaguars of the National Football League, as well as wet leases to other airlines. With such wet lease arrangements, World Airways essentially functioned as a cargo airline arm of another airline for whom a separate division would not be an efficient use of resources.

In 2006, World Airways became a subsidiary of World Air Holdings, Inc. On April 5, 2007, World Airways returned to its Oakland and Bay Area roots where they were headquartered from 1956 to 1987. It was later acquired by ATA Holdings, which was renamed Global Aero Logistics, in a transaction valued at $315 million. With this, ATA's president, Subodh Karnik became the head of all three certificated airlines autonomous operations, ATA Airlines, North American Airlines, and World Airways. In 2007 GAL moved its operation to the World Airways building in Peachtree City, Georgia. Robert Binns was named chief executive officer of GAL in April 2008 and Charlie McDonald was named president. Larry Montford became COO of World Airways.

On March 27, 2014, World Airways announced the immediate cessation of all operations. At the time of its closure, World's fleet consisted of MD-11 trijet aircraft both in freighter and passenger configurations and of 747-400 freighters.

On November 8, 2017, investment firm 777 Partners, announced it had acquired the intellectual property of World Airways, Inc. and planned to relaunch the airline as a low cost international carrier with a fleet of Boeing 787 Dreamliners. The new airline was to be based at Miami International Airport with MIA and Los Angeles International Airport as initial operating hubs.

Scheduled passenger service

World Airways operated scheduled international and domestic passenger service with its McDonnell Douglas DC-10 wide body jetliners, the Boeing 747-200, as well as Boeing 727 jets. Scheduled service began in the late 1970s with airline deregulation, starting April 11, 1979, ending September 15, 1986. Crew bases included Wrightstown, NJ (WRI-closed), Oakland, CA (OAK-company headquarters), Los Angeles, CA (LAX), Baltimore, MD (BWI), and later San Francisco, CA (SFO). The company theme song in the early 1980s, featured at the beginning of the onboard aircraft safety videos and used for advertising, had an instrumental version that played on an easy listening radio station in the San Francisco bay area until new advertising was introduced in 1985.  The Airline revisited scheduled service in 1996 with the McDonnell Douglas MD-11 aircraft, but this was short lived.  Destinations served included:

 Baltimore, MD (BWI)
 Frankfurt, Germany (FRA)
 Honolulu, HI (HNL)
 Kansas City, MO (MCI)
 London, England (LGW)
 Los Angeles, CA (LAX)
 Newark, NJ (EWR)
 Oakland, CA (OAK)
 Orlando, FL (MCO)
 San Francisco, CA (SFO)
 Boston, MA - (BOS)
 San Juan, PR - (SJU)

Fleet

As of March 2014, the World Airways fleet consisted of the following aircraft, with an average fleet age of 19.8 years:

Historical fleet
World Airways also previously operated the following aircraft types during its existence:

Corporate headquarters
World Airways's corporate headquarters were in Peachtree City, Georgia in Greater Atlanta.

In 1956, World Airways located its headquarters from the east coast to the grounds of Oakland International Airport (OAK) in Oakland, California in the San Francisco Bay Area. World Airways built the World Air Center at Oakland, which served as the company headquarters and maintenance facilities from 1973 through 1986. The World Air Center hangar was able to accommodate four 747s and provided maintenance services to other carriers, as well as the U.S. military. In 1987, headquarters moved to unincorporated Fairfax County, Virginia, near Herndon, in Greater Washington DC. In 2001 World Airways relocated to Peachtree City from Fairfax County.

Accidents and incidents

See also
 List of defunct airlines of the United States

References

External links

 
 
 
 
 Archived at Ghostarchive and the Wayback Machine: 
 Archived at Ghostarchive and the Wayback Machine: 
 Archived at Ghostarchive and the Wayback Machine: 

 
Airlines established in 1948
Airlines disestablished in 2014
Defunct companies based in Georgia (U.S. state)
Privately held companies based in Georgia (U.S. state)
Defunct companies based in the San Francisco Bay Area
Defunct cargo airlines
American companies established in 1948
Defunct seaplane operators